The 1879 Harvard Crimson football team represented Harvard University in the 1879 college football season. They finished with a 2–1–2 record.  The team captain was Robert Bacon.

On November 8, Harvard and Yale played to a scoreless tie before a crowd of between 1,500 and 2,000 spectators at Hamilton Park in New Haven. Yale captain Walter Camp drop-kicked the ball through the uprights, but the goal was disallowed when the referee ruled the ball had touched a Harvard player.

On November 15, Harvard lost to Princeton before a crowd of 3,000 persons at St. George's Cricket Ground in Hoboken. Princeton scored one goal, and Harvard scored none.

Schedule

References

Harvard
Harvard Crimson football seasons
Harvard Crimson football